The 1996–97 ISU Champions Series Final was an elite figure skating competition held in Hamilton, Ontario, Canada from February 28 through March 2, 1997. Medals were awarded in men's singles, ladies' singles, pair skating, and ice dancing.

The Champions Series Final was the culminating event of the ISU Champions Series, which consisted of Skate America, Skate Canada International, Nations Cup, Trophée Lalique, Cup of Russia, and NHK Trophy competitions. The top six skaters from each discipline competed in the final.

Results

Men

Ladies

Pairs

Ice dancing

External links
 Ice Skating International Online

1997 in figure skating
Grand Prix of Figure Skating Final
Grand Prix of Figure Skating Final
Grand Prix of Figure Skating Final
Grand Prix of Figure Skating Final